The 1995 Women's European Cricket Cup was an international cricket tournament held in Ireland from 18 to 22 July 1995. It was the fourth edition of the Women's European Championship, and all matches at the tournament held One Day International (ODI) status.

Four teams participated, with the hosts, Ireland, joined by the three other European members of the International Women's Cricket Council (IWCC) – Denmark, England, and the Netherlands. A round-robin format was used, with the top two teams proceeding to the final. England was undefeated in the round-robin stage and beat Ireland by seven wickets in the final, winning the championship for the fourth time in a row. Ireland's Mary-Pat Moore led the tournament in runs (and scored the only century, against Denmark), and England's Kathryn Leng was the leading wicket-taker. All matches at the tournament were played in Dublin, with five venues being used for the seven matches played.

Squads

Round-robin

Points table

Source: CricketArchive

Fixtures

Final

Statistics

Most runs
The top five run scorers (total runs) are included in this table.

Source: CricketArchive

Most wickets

The top five wicket takers are listed in this table, listed by wickets taken and then by bowling average.

Source: CricketArchive

References

1990
International women's cricket competitions in Ireland
1995 in women's cricket
International cricket competitions from 1994–95 to 1997
July 1995 sports events in Europe
1995 in English cricket
cricket
cricket
cricket
cricket